Walter William Massey (28 January 1882 – 8 November 1959) was a New Zealand politician of the Reform Party.

He represented the Hauraki electorate from the 1931 by-election (after the death of Arthur Hall), to 1935 when he was defeated by Charles Robert Petrie of the Labour Party.

He was a son of Prime Minister William Massey, and brother of Jack Massey who represented the Franklin electorate.

In 1935, he was awarded the King George V Silver Jubilee Medal.

References

1882 births
1959 deaths
Reform Party (New Zealand) MPs
Unsuccessful candidates in the 1935 New Zealand general election
Members of the New Zealand House of Representatives
New Zealand MPs for North Island electorates
Children of prime ministers of New Zealand
Auckland Harbour Board members